Catalpa brevipes is a species of small tree in the family Bignoniaceae.

Its habitat is dry, limestone-soil forests.

References

brevipes
Trees of the Dominican Republic
Trees of Cuba
Trees of Haiti
Taxonomy articles created by Polbot